Calamotropha niveicostellus is a moth in the family Crambidae. It was described by George Hampson in 1919. It is found in Kenya.

References

Endemic moths of Kenya
Crambinae
Moths described in 1919